Kernaghan is a surname. Other spellings include Kernochan, Kernohan, Kernighan, and Kernahan.  
Notable people with the surname include:

Business
James Powell Kernochan (1831-1897), American businessman
Catherine Lorillard Kernochan (1835–1917), his wife

Entertainment
Roxanne Kernohan (1960–1993), Canadian actress
Paolo Kernahan, Trinidadian television presenter
Sarah Kernochan (born 1947), American filmmaker

Law
J. Frederic Kernochan (1842-1929), American attorney
Mary Stuart Whitney Kernochan (1849–1922), his wife
John Marshall Kernochan (1919-2007), American law professor

Literature
Coulson Kernahan (1858-1943), English novelist
Eileen Kernaghan (born 1939), Canadian novelist
Robert Kirkland Kernighan (1854-1926), Canadian poet

Music
Lee Kernaghan (born 1964),  Australian country music singer and songwriter
Ray Kernaghan, Australian country music artist
Tania Kernaghan (born 1968), Australian country music singer

Politics
Charles Kernaghan (born 1948), American activist
Liz Kernohan (1939–2004), Australian politician
Mae Kernaghan (1901-1980), former Republican member of the Pennsylvania House of Representatives
Patricia Kernighan, American politician
Terence Kernaghan Canadian politician

Science
James Watson Kernohan, American pathologist
Brian Kernighan (born 1942), Canadian computer scientist

Sport
Alan Kernaghan (born 1967), professional football player and coach
David Kernahan (born 1965), Australian rules football player
Hugh Kernohan (born 1958), Scottish fencer
Mike Kernaghan (born 1955), lawn bowls competitor for New Zealand
Stephen Kernahan (born 1963), Australian rules football player

See also
Margaret Kernochan Leech (1893–1974), American historian and fiction writer
William Kernahan Thomas (1911-2001), American judge
Kernohan, Edmonton, neighbourhood in Edmonton, Canada
Kernahan, St. Catharines, neighbourhood in St. Catharines, Canada
Kernohan's notch, a medical sign